Charles Nelson Holloway (1872 – 30 March 1938) was an architect based in Nottingham.

History
He was born in Barnsley, Yorkshire, the son of William Holloway (b. 1837), a Civil Engineer, and Julia Nelson (1835–1914).

He was educated at High Pavement School, Nottingham and the Nottingham School of Art and in 1891 was awarded a Bronze Medal in the Government examinations for his design for a municipal building.

He married Emily Mary Hart, daughter of Maurice Hart of Church House, Moreton, on 3 July 1900 at St Andrew's Church, Moreton, Herefordshire.

In 1901 he won a competition for a new Wesleyan Church and Schools at Oxford.

He died of heart failure at his home, Balmoral House, 5 Station Villas, Beeston, Nottingham on 30 March 1938  and left an estate valued at £648 14s. 2d..

Works
Two Boarding Houses, Skegness 1898
Workshop and Offices, Pepper Street, Nottingham 1898
Baptist Church, Beeston, Nottingham 1898 (demolished 2015)
House behind the Post Office, Beeston, Nottingham ca. 1900
Queen's Walk Congregational Church 1900-02
Midland Bank, High Road, Beeston, Nottingham 1901-02 (demolished ca. 1967)
Tower house 139 Station Road, Beeston 1905
Shirebrook Congregational Church, Shirebrook, Derbyshire 1905 (now the home of the Royal British Legion)
Houses on Cyril Avenue and Vernon Avenue, Beeston, Nottingham 1906
7 Chilwell Road, Beeston 1909 (demolished 1965)

References

1872 births
1938 deaths
20th-century English architects
Alumni of Nottingham School of Art
Architects from Nottingham
People educated at Nottingham High Pavement Grammar School
People from Barnsley